This list of space telescopes (astronomical space observatories) is grouped by major frequency ranges: gamma ray, x-ray, ultraviolet, visible, infrared, microwave and radio. Telescopes that work in multiple frequency bands are included in all of the appropriate sections. Space telescopes that collect particles, such as cosmic ray nuclei and/or electrons, as well as instruments that aim to detect gravitational waves, are also listed. Missions with specific targets within the Solar System (e.g. the Sun and its planets), are excluded; see List of Solar System probes for these, and List of Earth observation satellites for missions targeting Earth.
 
Two values are provided for the dimensions of the initial orbit. For telescopes in Earth orbit, the min and max altitude are given in kilometers. For telescopes in solar orbit, the minimum distance (periapsis) and the maximum distance (apoapsis) between the telescope and the center of mass of the sun are given in astronomical units (AU).

Gamma ray 

Gamma ray telescopes collect and measure individual, high energy gamma rays from astrophysical sources. These are absorbed by the atmosphere, requiring that observations are done by high-altitude balloons or space missions. Gamma rays can be generated by supernovae, neutron stars, pulsars and black holes. Gamma ray bursts, with extremely high energies, have also been detected but have yet to be identified.

X-ray 

X-ray telescopes measure high-energy photons called X-rays. These can not travel a long distance through the atmosphere, meaning that they can only be observed high in the atmosphere or in space. Several types of astrophysical objects emit X-rays, from galaxy clusters, through black holes in active galactic nuclei to galactic objects such as supernova remnants, stars, and binary stars containing a white dwarf (cataclysmic variable stars), neutron star or black hole (X-ray binaries). Some Solar System bodies emit X-rays, the most notable being the Moon, although most of the X-ray brightness of the Moon arises from reflected solar X-rays. A combination of many unresolved X-ray sources is thought to produce the observed X-ray background.

Ultraviolet 

Ultraviolet telescopes make observations at ultraviolet wavelengths, i.e. between approximately 10 and 320 nm. Light at these wavelengths is absorbed by the Earth's atmosphere, so observations at these wavelengths must be performed from the upper atmosphere or from space. Objects emitting ultraviolet radiation include the Sun, other stars and galaxies.

UV ranges listed at Ultraviolet astronomy#Ultraviolet space telescopes.

Visible light

The oldest form of astronomy, optical or visible-light astronomy, observes wavelengths of light from approximately 400 to 700 nm. Positioning an optical telescope in space eliminates the distortions and limitations that hamper that ground-based optical telescopes (see Astronomical seeing), providing higher resolution images. Optical telescopes are used to look at planets, stars, galaxies, planetary nebulae and protoplanetary disks, amongst many other things.

Infrared and submillimetre 

Infrared light is of lower energy than visible light, hence is emitted by sources that are either cooler, or moving away from the observer (in present context: Earth) at high speed. As such, the following can be viewed in the infrared: cool stars (including brown dwarves), nebulae, and redshifted galaxies.

Microwave 

Microwave space telescopes have primarily been used to measure cosmological parameters from the Cosmic Microwave Background. They also measure synchrotron radiation, free-free emission and spinning dust from our Galaxy, as well as extragalactic compact sources and galaxy clusters through the Sunyaev-Zel'dovich effect.

Radio 

As the atmosphere is transparent for radio waves, radio telescopes in space are most useful for Very Long Baseline Interferometry: doing simultaneous observations of a source with both a satellite and a ground-based telescope and by correlating their signals to simulate a radio telescope the size of the separation between the two telescopes. Typical targets for observations include supernova remnants, masers, gravitational lenses, and starburst galaxies.

Particle detection 
Spacecraft and space-based modules that do particle detection, looking for cosmic rays and electrons. These can be emitted by the sun (Solar Energetic Particles), our galaxy (Galactic cosmic rays) and extragalactic sources (Extragalactic cosmic rays). There are also Ultra-high-energy cosmic rays from active galactic nuclei, those can be detected by ground-based detectors via their particle showers.

Gravitational waves 
A type of telescope that detects gravitational waves; ripples in space-time generated by colliding neutron stars or black holes.

To be launched

See also 
 List of proposed space observatories
 List of heliophysics missions
 List of solar telescopes
 Lists of telescopes
 Lists of spacecraft
 Great Observatories program

References

External links 
 

Space telescopes
telescopes
Telescopes